Charles "Hasie" Versfeld (24 September 1866 – 6 January 1941) was a South African international rugby union player. Born in Wynberg, Cape Town, he was educated at Green Point Grammar School before playing provincial rugby for Western Province. Versfeld made his only appearance for South Africa in the 3rd Test of Great Britain's 1891 tour, he played on the wing. His brother, Oupa Versfeld, was also selected to play in the 3rd Test of the series, making the Versfelds the first brothers to represent South Africa. Versfeld died in 1941, in Cape Town, at the age of 74.

References

South African rugby union players
South Africa international rugby union players
1866 births
1941 deaths
Rugby union players from Cape Town
Hamilton RFC, Sea Point players
Rugby union wings